Wenhui Bao, anglicized as the Wenhui Daily, is a Chinese daily newspaper published by the Shanghai United Media Group.

History
Wenhui Bao was founded in Shanghai on January 25, 1938 by leftist-leaning intellectuals centered on writer and journalist Ke Ling. Over the next decade, it was closed down twice for its political leanings.

In early 1956, Wenhui Bao was forced to relocate to Beijing and was renamed Jiaoshibao (Teacher's News). After the start of the Hundred Flowers Campaign, however, the paper was allowed to resume publication under its original name, beginning on 1 October 1956. Under its editor-in-chief Xu Zhucheng, Wenhui Bao became one of the most outspoken newspapers of the Hundred Flowers period, but was attacked by Mao Zedong in July 1957 and punished.

In the 1960s, Wenhui Bao became an outlet for Mao Zedong's editorials, and in late 1965 it was used by the Shanghai leftists supporting Jiang Qing and Zhang Chunqiao to launch their attack on the writer Wu Han.  Their polemical review of Wu's play Hai Rui Dismissed from Office became the triggers of China's Cultural Revolution. On 4 January 1967, the paper was taken over by radical Red Guards in the first power seizure in Shanghai.

In the 1980s, Wenhui Bao re-emerged as a widely read paper with a circulation of 1.8 million. In 1998, in a wave of creating press groups backed by the government, Wenhui Bao and Xinmin Wanbao were merged into the Wenhui-Xinmin United Press Group, which was the second largest press group in China after Guangzhou Daily Press Group in terms of advertisement revenues.

References

External links
 Official website 

Newspapers published in Shanghai
Daily newspapers published in China
Chinese-language newspapers (Simplified Chinese)
1938 establishments in China
Publications established in 1938
Chinese Communist Party newspapers